Ol' Skool Rodz is a bimonthly magazine that has been published since 2003, first by Geno DiPol and Koolhouse Publications, and then by Murphos Publishing in Buda, Texas since 2019. The magazine features topics such as Kustom Kulture lifestyles, pin-ups, rat rods, custom cars, and artwork. Its articles are often written in a humorous and irreverent style, and it has documented the work of leading custom car builders such as Bo Huff. The publication is known for setting fashion and hairstyle trends in the Kustom Kulture scene. The magazine is based in New Jersey. It has a widespread cult following in the Kustom Kulture scene and is considered (along with CK Deluxe) an authoratative view of this subculture's lifestyle.

References

External links
 Ol' Skool Rodz Website

Automobile magazines published in the United States
Bimonthly magazines published in the United States
Kustom Kulture
Magazines with year of establishment missing
Magazines published in New Jersey